The Bobrzanie are one of the Silesian tribes mentioned in the Prague document from the 11th century AD. The area they inhabited was located on the Bóbr river, from which they took their name.

References

Silesian tribes